Five ships of the Isle of Man Steam Packet Company have borne the name Mona's Queen.

  (1853–1880) Paddle steamer
  (1885–1929) Paddle steamer
  (1934–1940) pre-World War II passenger steamer; lost when she struck a mine off Dunkirk on 29 May 1940
  (1946–1962) second of the six sisters; converted to cruise ship, Fiesta; scrapped in 1981
  (1972–1995) first diesel-engined car/passenger ferry in the fleet;third of four car ferries; sold to MBRS Lines, Manila, Philippines; scrapped in 2008 at Alang

(dates of construction and service with IOMSPCo)

Ship names